These are the official results of the Men's 4x400 metres event at the 2003 IAAF World Championships in Paris, France. Their final was held on Sunday 31 August 2003 at 19:35h.

Final

Heats
Held on Saturday 30 August 2003

Heat 1

Heat 2

Heat 3

References
 Results

 
Relays at the World Athletics Championships